Muhammad Ridwan (born 26 March 1991) is an Indonesian professional footballer who plays as a goalkeeper for Liga 1 club PSS Sleman.

Club career

Persegres Gresik United
In 2015 Indonesia Super League, Ridwan joined in the squad of Persegres Gresik United. He was contracted for one year by club management. Ridwan made his debut on 5 April 2015 in a match against Borneo at the Petrokimia Stadium, Gresik.

Persib Bandung
Ridwan joined to Persib Bandung for 2016 Indonesia Soccer Championship A. He claimed, Persib Bandung is a team that coveted since childhood. He said "Persib is a great team and as a child, I had a dream to play here and finally I've achieved my goal. Obviously, I am delighted to be joining".

Semen Padang FC
In 2017, Ridwan joined Padang club Semen Padang. He became the third recruit of Semen Padang in this season. Ridwan made his debut on 17 April 2017 in a match against Sriwijaya at the Haji Agus Salim Stadium, Padang.

Persela Lamongan
In February 2018, Ridwan moved to Persela Lamongan. He made his league debut on 24 March 2018 in a match against Persipura Jayapura at the Mandala Stadium, Jayapura.

Madura United
In 2019, Ridwan signed a contract with Indonesian Liga 1 club Madura United. He made his debut on 4 July 2019 in a match against PSM Makassar at the Gelora Ratu Pamelingan Stadium, Pamekasan.

PSS Sleman
Ridwan was signed for PSS Sleman to play in Liga 1 in the 2022–23 season. He made his league debut on 23 July 2022 in a match against PSM Makassar at the Maguwoharjo Stadium, Sleman.

International career
Ridwan called up to Indonesia under-21 team and played in 2012 Hassanal Bolkiah Trophy, but failed to win after losing 0-2 from Brunei under-21 team. In 2009, Ridwan represented the Indonesia U-23, in the 2009 Southeast Asian Games.

Honours

International
Indonesia U-21
Hassanal Bolkiah Trophy runner-up: 2012

References

External links
 Muhammad Ridwan at Soccerway

1992 births
Living people
People from Tangerang
Sportspeople from Banten
Indonesian footballers
Bontang F.C. players
Persijap Jepara players
Persegres Gresik players
Gresik United players
Persib Bandung players
Semen Padang F.C. players
Persela Lamongan players
Madura United F.C. players
PSS Sleman players
Indonesian Premier League players
Liga 1 (Indonesia) players
Indonesia youth international footballers
Association football goalkeepers